E. A. Scott was the head baseball coach of the LSU Tigers baseball team in 1897. Scott was the second coach in the history of the LSU Baseball program. 

During his one season as head coach, he finished the season with a 3–3 record and  winning percentage.

References
 

Baseball coaches from Louisiana
LSU Tigers baseball coaches